Resurrection Man is a 1998 Irish extreme horror period drama film, set specifically in Northern Ireland, directed by Marc Evans with a screenplay written by Eoin McNamee based on his novel of the same name. The story is loosely based on the real-life "Shankill Butchers", an Ulster loyalist gang in 1970s Belfast who conducted random killings of Catholic civilians until their leader, Lenny Murphy, was assassinated by a Provisional IRA hit squad.

Cast
Stuart Townsend – Victor Kelly
John Hannah – Darkie Larche
James Nesbitt – Ryan
James Ellis – Coppinger
Brenda Fricker – Dorcas Kelly
Geraldine O'Rawe – Heather Graham
Seán McGinley – Sammy McClure
George Shane – James Kelly

Production
Although set in Belfast, Resurrection Man was not filmed there, with the English cities of Manchester, Liverpool and Warrington serving as the film's locations.

Critical reception and analysis
In an essay entitled "Vampire Troubles: Loyalism and Resurrection Man", academic Steve Baker argues that the film can be interpreted as a vampire film, "situating it within a loyalist self image of vampirism". In fact, Stuart Townsend's performance in this film was what prompted Michael Rymer to cast him the role of the Vampire Lestat in Queen of the Damned.

References

External links

1998 films
Northern Irish films
Films about The Troubles (Northern Ireland)
Films directed by Marc Evans
Films set in Belfast
Films shot in Greater Manchester
Films scored by David Holmes (musician)
1990s English-language films
Crime horror films
British horror thriller films